The 1981 Calder Cup playoffs of the American Hockey League began on April 7, 1981. The eight teams that qualified played best-of-seven series for Division Semifinals and Division Finals. The division champions played a best-of-seven series for the Calder Cup.  The Calder Cup Final ended on May 20, 1981, with the Adirondack Red Wings defeating the Maine Mariners four games to two to win the Calder Cup for the first time in team history.

Maine set an AHL record for the most goals allowed in one playoff with 81. What makes this more notable is that the AHL playoffs now consist of four rounds of best-of-7 series, whereas Maine set this record in only 20 games—where the playoffs consisted of only three rounds of best-of-7 series.

Playoff seeds
After the 1980–81 AHL regular season, the top four teams from each division qualified for the playoffs. The Hershey Bears finished the regular season with the best overall record.

Northern Division
Maine Mariners - 97 points
New Brunswick Hawks - 84 points
Nova Scotia Voyageurs - 81 points
Springfield Indians - 73 points

Southern Division
Hershey Bears - 103 points
Adirondack Red Wings - 75 points
Binghamton Whalers - 70 points
New Haven Nighthawks - 69 points

Bracket

In each round, the team that earned more points during the regular season receives home ice advantage, meaning they receive the "extra" game on home-ice if the series reaches the maximum number of games. There is no set series format due to arena scheduling conflicts and travel considerations.

Division Semifinals 
Note 1: Home team is listed first.
Note 2: The number of overtime periods played (where applicable) is not indicated

Northern Division

(1) Maine Mariners vs. (4) Springfield Indians

(2) New Brunswick Hawks vs. (3) Nova Scotia Voyageurs

Southern Division

(1) Hershey Bears vs. (4) New Haven Nighthawks

(2) Adirondack Red Wings vs. (3) Binghamton Whalers

Division Finals

Northern Division

(1) Maine Mariners vs. (2) New Brunswick Hawks

Southern Division

(1) Hershey Bears vs. (2) Adirondack Red Wings

Calder Cup Final

(N1) Maine Mariners vs. (S2) Adirondack Red Wings

See also
1980–81 AHL season
List of AHL seasons

References

Calder Cup
Calder Cup playoffs